Ugo Amaldi; born 1934, is an Italian physicist. He is the son of the first CERN secretary general Edoardo Amaldi. Ugo Amaldi was a professor at the physics department of the University of Milan, having previously worked at Istituto Superiore di Sanità and CERN. He holds honorary doctorates from University of Lyon, University of Uppsala (1993), University of Valencia and University of Helsinki. He is a Fellow of the European Physical Society, a Distinguished Affiliated Professor at Technical University of Munich, member of the Accademia dei Lincei, and was awarded the inaugural Bruno Pontecorvo Prize by JINR. He also founded the Hadron Therapy Project at CERN in 1991.

References

External links
 

20th-century Italian physicists
Academic staff of the University of Milan
1934 births
Living people
People associated with CERN